Kalkankaya can refer to:

 Kalkankaya, Karakoçan
 Kalkankaya, Posof